Ferm is a surname. Notable people with the surname include:

Anders Ferm (born 1938), Swedish diplomat and politician
Björn Ferm (born 1944), Swedish modern pentathlete
Charles Ferm (1566–1617), Scottish educator
Jackie Ferm (born 1990), Swedish writer and model
Olle Ferm (born 1947), Swedish swimmer
Tyrone Ferm, Swedish sprint canoeist
Vergilius Ferm (1896–1974), American philosopher

See also
FERM domain
Ferme (disambiguation)